David Galvin (born 5 October 1946) is an English former professional footballer. His clubs included Wolverhampton Wanderers, Wimbledon and Gillingham, where he made over 200 Football League appearances.

References

1946 births
Living people
Footballers from South Yorkshire
English footballers
Gillingham F.C. players
Wolverhampton Wanderers F.C. players
Wimbledon F.C. players
Ebbsfleet United F.C. players
Canterbury City F.C. players
Association football defenders